zeitraumexit (registered association) is an artist centre in Mannheim. The non-profit association and independent institution organizes, curates and (co-)produces exhibitions, performances, theatre, video art and installations.

History
zeitraumexit came into being in 2000, as a result of the merger between  Zeitraum für Büro und Kunst and EX!T Ausgangspunkt Theater.
“The quartet represents extraordinary, international art projects in the region which unite visual and performing arts ever since.”

The founding members are the artists Gabriele Osswald (performance, visual arts), Wolfgang Sautermeister (performance, visual arts), Elke Schmid (director) and Tilo Schwarz (drawing, set & lighting design), as well as the members of the executive board Manfred Ziegler, Peter Empl and Gerhard Schöneberger. Apart from engaging with zeitraumexit, the artistic directors Osswald, Sautermeister, Schmid and Schwarz also work as solo artists. They are being invited to venues as far across the globe as Seoul. Elke Schmid left zeitraumexit in 2009 to further pursue her work in Berlin.

From May 2000 to May 2007, the facilities of zeitraumexit were located in Mannheim's district Neckarstadt-Ost. In 2007, zeitraumexit moved into the historical Kaufmannmühle, a former corn mill under monument protection, which is located in the Jungbusch district. In the new facilities, two ateliers, a theatre space (for 60 spectators), one exhibition hall, a bar and office spaces were installed. The yard is used as an open-air stage. The association is mainly financed with private means, such as the Hector foundation and the National Performance Network. Apart from this, they are “constantly dependent on 30 to 60 volunteers’ support.” Coverage on zeitraumexit takes place via the regional news (e.g. Mannheimer Morgen, Rheinpfalz), radio broadcasting (SWR, DLF) and TV (3sat); in trans-regional newspapers and journals (Süddeutsche Zeitung, Theater der Zeit, tanz aktuell, Kunstforum international) online (ZDFtheaterkanal) and on television (ntv).
In 2008, the artistic direction of zeitraumexit received the Baerwind prize from the Rudi-Baerwind foundation, as the collective “confirms quite exactly to Baerwind’s imagination of a symphony with its border-transgressing  energy.”  Zeitraumexit is “a meeting point for artists and people interested in art beyond established cultural institutions. The festival “Wunder der Prärie” (Wonder of the Prairie), which is organized by zeitraumexit every other year, acquired a set slot in the region's event schedule and receives attention that surpasses the regional scale.”

Events
zeitraumexit realizes about 14 events each year on about 100 days with ca. 10,330 visitors (2011 numbers). Therefore, zeitraumexit frequently cooperates with fellow regional and international cultural institutions such as the Alte Feuerwache, Cinema Quadrat and TiG7 (Mannheim), Kunstcentrum Campo (Ghent, Belgium), brut Wien (Vienna, Austria), Kampnagel (Hamburg) and Rotterdamse Schouwburg (Rotterdamm, Niederlande). Annual events, to name a few, are the presentation of the award winners of the European Media Art Festival; 97m überm Meer, “[a] noteworthy [open] stage of the Region” for performing artists; Wilsonstraße, with Applied Theatre Studies students from Giessen (ATW – Angewandte Theaterwissenschaften); and frisch eingetroffen. The latter is a festival which provides young artists of the divisions of dance, performance and theatre from Europe over several days.  As part of the 15.Internationale Schillertage, the cultural office of Mannheim (Kulturamt Mannheim) organized the independent theatre days Schwindelfrei as the city's contribution to the Schillerjahr 2009. zeitraumexit participated with its own production Harry L.- Eine Auflösung, directed by René Arnold, who realized a “successful form of discourse theatre.”  “As [further] development of the initial festival,” Schwindelfrei 2010 obtained a “holistic concept which was curated in terms of its content”. zeitraumexit participated in the invitation to tender with 1st Person Plural by director Nicola Unger, a coproduction with the Schouwburg Rotterdam, and was selected for funding by the cultural office of Mannheim (Kulturamt Mannheim).

Wunder der Prärie (Wonders of the Prairie)
Wunder der Prärie is zeitraumexit's most extensive festival, which extends over a period of eleven days. With about 5000 visitors it is one of the top 15 festivals in the Metropolregion Rhein-Neckar and has “acquired and extensive reputation amongst artists and art-lovers” within a short period of time. The main sponsor of the festival since 2005 is the company BASF SE. The festival sparked in July 2000, when zeitraumexit had the hosting role at the 9th International Performance Conference. The festival does not only take place in galleries and theatre spaces but also opens up further towards the city and revitalizes urban space every other year since it was launched: Gob Squad already performed in the Holiday Inn with Room Service - Help Me Make It Through The Night and at the Paradeplatz with Save the World -  A Very Very Wide Screen Film (a coproduction with zeitraumexit, Hebbel am Ufer Berlin, Kampnagel Hamburg, and Wiener Festwochen), a covered car park was turned into am exhibition space and Friederike&Uwe constructed an imitation of the water reservoir tower (Wasserturm) in the main station with ministeck (My home is my Wasserturm). The “most spectacular festival action” so far has been the project cape fear of the raumlaborberlin: “Together with locals,” the interdisciplinary collective for architecture and city planning constructed “a submarine out of recycling materials (…) in a public place” during the 10 days of festival.  “At the last day (…) [of the festival], Mannheim’s Neckarspitze (Neckar nose) was circumvented to land at the Ludwigshafen Rihne bank. For eleven days, Wunder der Prärie brings dance, theatre, Performance and Fine Arts of national and international agents “from Auckland to Zurich” to Mannheim – pleasingly together with many guests such as:
Anna Huber, Stefan Haegi (Rimini Protokoll), Hong O Bong, Nikitin, David Weber-Krebs, Hina Strüver, Jan-Philipp Possmann, Birgit Aßhoff, Ingrid Mwangi, Robert Hutter, Walter Siegfried, Marina P.O.P., Norbert Klassen, Phil Hayes[21], Marc Calame, Matthias Rüttimann, Nezaket Ekici, Genco Gulan, Herma Auguste Wittstock, Prof. Hans-Thies Lehmann, Claire Marshall (Forced Entertainment), Mike Pearson, She She Pop, Urban Lies, das Helmi[22], Dance on&off[23], Antonia Baehr, Lajos Talamonti, Boris Nieslony und Nathalie Djurberg.

Wunder der Prärie's mottos in the past years were:

•	2013: Wunder der Prärie, theme Laut geträumt – Dreaming aloud

•	2011: Wunder der Prärie, theme Das Unmögliche Wagen – Daring the Impossible

•	2009: Wunder der Prärie, theme Müll - Waste

•	2008: Wunder der Prärie, theme Angst - Fear

•	2007: Wunder der Prärie, theme 400 hours – nonstop

•	2006: Wunder der Prärie, theme Glück, Glück, Glück – Luck. Luck. Luck.

•	2005: >Wunder der Prärie< Thema Reisen - Travelling

•	2004: >Wunder der Prärie< Thema zu Hause – At Home

•	2003: >Do you understand<

•	2002: >stadtraum[ ]privatraum< - urban space[ ]private space

•	2001: >Die Wirklichkeit der Dinge< - The Reality of Things

•	2000: >Die Kunst des Handelns< 9. International Performance-Conference – The Art of Trade

Since 2009 Wunder der Prärie is being organized as Biennale.

External links 
 zeitraumexit (in German ony)
 Wunder der Praerie
 outside the box
 B-Seite

Theatre companies in Germany
Mannheim
Tourist attractions in Mannheim